Afif Bahnassi (17 April 1928 – 2 November 2017) was a Syrian Islamic art historian and museum curator, General Director of Antiquities and Museums in Damascus, Syria. He has authored books such as The Ancient Syria and His Art (1987) and The Art of Islam, with Nurhan Atasoy, published by UNESCO in 1992. He was on the governing board of the Research Centre for Islamic History, Art and Culture (IRCICA) based in Istanbul.

References

1928 births
2017 deaths
20th-century Syrian historians
Historians of Islamic art
Syrian art historians
21st-century Syrian historians